Anuvis Anays Angulo Castillo (born 3 May 2001) is a Panamanian footballer who plays as a forward for the Panama women's national team.

International career
Angulo appeared in one match for Panama at the 2018 CONCACAF Women's Championship.

See also
 List of Panama women's international footballers

References

2001 births
Living people
Panamanian women's footballers
Women's association football forwards
Panama women's international footballers